José David Serrano Suárez (born 17 October 2002) is a Venezuelan footballer who plays as a forward for Venezuelan Primera División side Zamora FC.

Career

Club career
Serrano is a product of Zamora FC. In February 2018, Serrano signed a new deal with Zamora. Less than two weeks after he turned 16 years old, Serrano got his official debut for Zamora in the Venezuelan Primera División against Aragua FC on 28 October 2018. Serrano started on the bench, before coming in as a substitute for Darwin Matheus in the 60th minute. His debut was one out of two league games, that he played for Zamora in 2018.

In 2019, he made no appearances in the league, however, one appearance in the Copa Venezuela. In 2020, 18-year old Serrano began playing more regularly. He played 14 league games and scored three goals for Zamora.

International career
In 2017, Serrano was summoned to the Venezuelan U-15 team ahead of the 2017 South American U-15 Championship. A year later, in 2018, he was also a part of the Venezuelan U-17 national team.

References

External links
 

Living people
2002 births
Association football forwards
Venezuelan footballers
Venezuela youth international footballers
Venezuelan Primera División players
Zamora FC players
People from Barinas (state)